"Whoever Did This" is the 48th episode of the HBO original series The Sopranos and the ninth of the show's fourth season. Written by Robin Green and Mitchell Burgess, and directed by Tim Van Patten, it originally aired on November 10, 2002.

Starring
 James Gandolfini as Tony Soprano
 Lorraine Bracco as Dr. Jennifer Melfi * 
 Edie Falco as Carmela Soprano
 Michael Imperioli as Christopher Moltisanti
 Dominic Chianese as Corrado Soprano Jr. 
 Steven Van Zandt as Silvio Dante
 Tony Sirico as Paulie Gualtieri
 Robert Iler as Anthony Soprano Jr. 
 Jamie-Lynn Sigler as Meadow Soprano *
 Drea de Matteo as Adriana La Cerva *
 Aida Turturro as Janice Soprano
 Steven R. Schirripa as Bobby Baccalieri
 John Ventimiglia as Artie Bucco
 Joe Pantoliano as Ralph Cifaretto

* = credit only

Guest starring

Synopsis
Junior is hospitalized with a concussion after a boom mic sends him falling down the courthouse steps. He soon recovers and enjoys his hospital stay as a respite from the RICO trial. Tony recognizes this as a potential advantage and convinces Junior to feign dementia during his competency hearings. He gives a good performance but begins exhibiting actual signs of dementia in private.

Ralphie's 12-year-old son Justin is hit in the chest with an arrow while play-acting The Lord of the Rings with a friend, resulting in significant blood loss and brain damage. While delivering some cash to Tony, Ralphie cries openly. Expressing a desire for some kind of redemption, he meets with Father Phil and establishes a scholarship at Rutgers in Jackie Jr.'s name. Everyone sympathizes with him except Paulie. His mother recently received a traumatic prank phone call, and Paulie correctly suspects that it was from Ralphie, retaliating against him for ratting him out to Johnny.

At the stables, a fire breaks out, apparently caused by faulty electrical wiring. Pie-O-My is badly burned and has to be euthanized. Tony immediately suspects Ralphie, and confronts him at his home over the suspicious timing of the fire: the $200,000 insurance pay-out would cover Justin's medical bills. Ralphie vehemently denies the accusation, but their argument escalates into a physical fight, culminating in Tony strangling Ralphie to death. Tony calls Christopher for help. Christopher arrives late and high on heroin. Together, they dismember Ralphie's body in his bathtub with a meat cleaver, after which Christopher and Tony bury his severed head, toupee, and hands on a farm, throw his body off a cliff into the water below, and sink the rest of his remains in a flooded quarry.

Tony never outright admits to Christopher that he killed Ralphie, and Christopher never expresses outright suspicion. After completing the disposal, they clean up at the Bada Bing, where Tony passes out and wakes up alone the following morning.

Deceased
 Pie-O-My: and several other horses: Killed in a stable fire. Cause is deemed accidental by fire marshal.
 Ralph Cifaretto: beaten and strangled to death by Tony Soprano due to suspicion that he caused the fire that killed Pie-O-My, which Ralph denies, but also due to his murder of Tracee, the 20-year stripper Ralph kills in "University". His body is then dismembered and decapitated with the help of Christopher Moltisanti.

Title reference
 Tony uses the phrase "whoever did this" when discussing with Christopher who exactly was responsible for Ralphie's death. Earlier, he used the phrase in reference to the guilty party responsible for the prank call to Paulie's mother.

Connections to prior episodes
When Tony confronts Ralph about the fire, he asks him about Corky Ianucci. Tony believes Ralph hired him to start the stable fire which killed Pie-O-My. Corky was also apparently used by Silvio to help blow up Vesuvio, the restaurant owned by Artie Bucco, in the pilot episode.
 When Tony looks in the mirror the morning after killing Ralph, he sees a picture of Tracee, the Bada Bing stripper whom Ralph killed in the episode "University".

Other cultural references
 Carmela is seen wearing a Columbia University T-shirt when talking to Tony and her son in the kitchen.
 After Ralph's murder, Tony and Christopher watch The Last Time I Saw Paris (1954) on Ralph's television.
 Ralph mentions Shamu the whale in a passing reference to Ginny Sacrimoni.

Music
 "When I Need You" by Leo Sayer is played when Ralph is in the bath.
The Moonglows' original recording of "Sincerely" plays while Carmela and Rosalie dine at Vesuvio.
 The song played over the end credits is "The Man with the Harmonica" by Apollo 440. It is a cover of the Ennio Morricone score of Once Upon a Time in the West, a Sergio Leone film. The man with the harmonica was played by Charles Bronson.
 Though not heard, the song "Sympathy For The Devil" by the Rolling Stones is referenced four times through various dialogue directly alluding to Ralph as the devil. The references allude to the fact that Ralph is portrayed somewhat sympathetically for the first time in this episode.
Ralph to a surgeon: "Please, allow me to introduce myself."
Ralph to Father Intintola: "Pleased to meet you."
Father Intintola to Ralph: "Were you there, when Jesus Christ had his moment of doubt and pain?" 
Tony to Paulie: "Paulie, his kid's in the hospital. A little fuckin' sympathy, huh?"

True-crime influence
Jason Bautista was convicted of killing his mentally ill mother in Riverside, California, on January 14, 2003, then dumping her decapitated body with its hands removed off Ortega Highway in Orange County. Jason's half-brother, Matthew Montejo, who was 15 years old when Jason killed their mother, testified in court that he helped dispose of her body and that they got the idea to chop off her head and hands to hide the crime from this episode.

Awards
"Whoever Did This" was Joe Pantoliano's 2003 winning submission for the Primetime Emmy Award for Outstanding Supporting Actor in a Drama Series, along with the episode "Christopher".

References

External links
"Whoever Did This"  at HBO

The Sopranos (season 4) episodes
2002 American television episodes
Television episodes directed by Tim Van Patten